William H. Geer (d. September 30, 1928), was an American Major League Baseball player who played most of his career as a shortstop for five seasons and a total of seven teams. He is most notable for his status as possibly the youngest player in Major League history.

Career
Geer made his professional baseball debut for the New York Mutuals of the National Association. The following season, while playing for the New Haven Elm Citys, he was arrested along with his roommate, Henry Luff, for burglary of several hotel rooms.

Age controversy
At age 15 years 63 days, he is credited as the youngest player to ever appear in a Major League Baseball game. There is controversy about his age, or the fact that the National Association has not been officially credited as a "major league".

References

External links

Date of birth missing
Major League Baseball shortstops
19th-century baseball players
New York Mutuals players
New Haven Elm Citys players
Cincinnati Reds (1876–1879) players
Worcester Ruby Legs players
Philadelphia Keystones players
Brooklyn Atlantics (AA) players
Louisville Colonels players
Syracuse Stars (minor league baseball) players
Brooklyn Grays (Interstate Association) players
Muskegon (minor league baseball) players
Hartford Babies players
1928 deaths